Sigoyer may refer to the following places in France:

 Sigoyer, Alpes-de-Haute-Provence, a commune in the department of Alpes-de-Haute-Provence
 Sigoyer, Hautes-Alpes, a commune in the department of Hautes-Alpes

Other uses
 Sigoyer (grape), an alternative name for the French wine grape Calitor.
 Bouteillan noir, another French wine grape that is also known as Sigoyer.